Antennaria pulchella is a North American species of flowering plants in the family Asteraceae known by the common names showy pussytoes and handsome pussytoes. It is widespread across much of Canada including the three Arctic Territories, as well as in parts of the United States (Alaska, the northern Rocky Mountains and northern Cascades).

Description
Antennaria pulcherrima is a herbaceous plant up to 65 cm tall. Male and female flowers are borne on separate plants. It tends to grow on alluvial soils deposited by streams, generally in alpine or subarctic environments.

Subspecies
 Antennaria pulcherrima subsp. eucosma (Fernald & Wiegand) R.J.Bayer – limestone barrens in Newfoundland and on Anticosti Island (part of Quebec)
 Antennaria pulcherrima subsp. pulcherrima – most of species range

References

External links
Alaska Wildflowers
Saskatchewan Wildflowers
Digital Flora of Newfoundland links to several photos of subsp. eucosma

pulcherrima
Plants described in 1834
Flora of Subarctic America
Flora of Canada
Flora of the Northwestern United States
Flora of the Southwestern United States
Flora without expected TNC conservation status